Léo Rossi (born 25 December 1999) is a French badminton player. He was a part of the French junior team that won the mixed team gold at the 2017 European Junior Championships. He won his first international title at the 2017 Lithuanian International tournament in the men's doubles event partnered with Elias Bracke of Belgium. He also won is first international title at the 2018 Irish International tournament in the men's single event beating top 80 players.

His brother, Rémi Rossi, also plays badminton and represented Tahiti in the international tournament.

Achievements

BWF International Challenge/Series (2 titles, 6 runners-up) 
Men's singles

Men's doubles

  BWF International Challenge tournament
  BWF International Series tournament
  BWF Future Series tournament

References

External links 
 

1999 births
Living people
People from Grasse
French male badminton players
Sportspeople from Alpes-Maritimes